The Montana Club was founded in 1885 in Helena, Montana Territory by male attorneys, bankers, mining, livestock and timber magnates, politicians, transportation titans, and wholesalers. Until June 2018, the Montana Club was the longest-continuously open private club between Minneapolis and Seattle until it reorganized as a co-operative association and opened to the public for à la carte dining, private dining, weddings, celebrations and business meetings.

History
The Montana Club was founded in 1885 by a group of 130 men from the Territory and throughout the United States for "literary, mutual improvement & social purposes."  Members assembled in various locations throughout  downtown Helena until 1891 when they purchased a triangular-shaped plot of land owned by Samuel Thomas Hauser for a clubhouse. The first Montana Club, designed by architects John C. Paulsen and John LaValle, was built in 1891-1893 and followed the strict hierarchical and spatial requirements of London's private clubs first established in the 1700s.

The building was gutted by an arson fire in April 1903 set by the bartender's son and was declared a total loss by the club's Wall Street, New York City insurance company.  Members hastily contracted with St Paul/New York City architect Cass Gilbert, assisted by George H. Carsley, to replicate the old clubhouse's floor plan but to add a rathskeller and dining room or banquet hall. Contrary to popular myth and erroneous information, the granite arches were totally dismantled, inventoried and set aside for potential incorporation into the new structure. The new building was constructed using brick manufactured by the Western Clay Mfg. Co. (Kessler Brick Co.) west of downtown, recycling some of the granite from the razed clubhouse, augmented with new granite from the nearby Baxendale quarry.

References

Buildings and structures in Helena, Montana
1893 establishments in Montana
Clubhouses in Montana
Buildings and structures completed in 1893
Gentlemen's clubs in the United States